= Taganrog Town Council Building =

Building of town council
- Здание городской управы
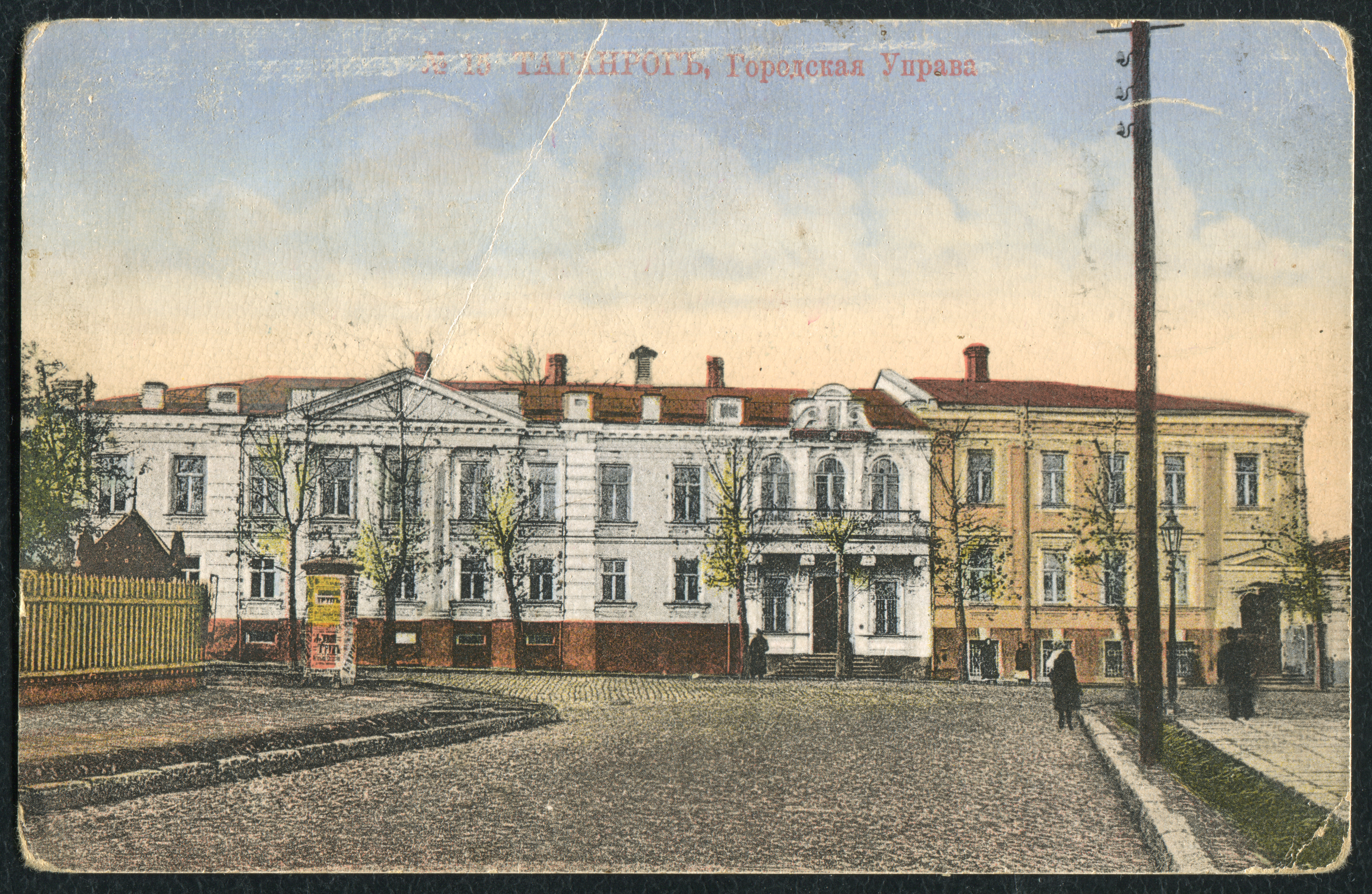
- 47.2172°N 38.9258°E
- Beginning date: 1830
- Completion date: 1959

The Taganrog Town Council Building (Russian: Здание городской управы) is a mansion in central Taganrog. Located at 87 Petrovskaya Street.

== Mansion history ==
The three-storied building with quadrangular columns, is located at the address by Petrovskaya St. 87, opposite to Maly Sadovy Lane. The building was repeatedly reconstructed.

The first building was built on this land plot in the 1830th years by the merchant D. Petrokokino. At the end of the 1880th years it was acquired by the landowner K.N. Komneno-Varvatsi and capitally reconstructed. To the building the extension was made, the wing in the yard is connected to the main building transition, the facade is decorated according to new architectural fashion. In the building there were 62 rooms which were occupied by Komneno-Varvatsi's family consisting of the head of family and two daughters. After the events of the first Russian revolution of 1905 the landowner Komneno-Varvatsi frightened of disorders of peasants in the manor decided to sell the huge mansion in the city. He considered to live in it dangerous in so disturbing situation.

From 1907 to 1920, in the building there was a town council, during the post-reform period (since 1810) become the principal executive body of city self-government. From 1909 to 1914, the city museum with art gallery was placed in one of rooms. From 17 January to 1 February 1918, the building was occupied by Council of working deputies of Taganrog. With arrival to the city of Germans in May 1918, and then denikinsky troops, the town council returned on the place again. After returning to Soviet control, the house held the Revolutionary-military committee, from 10 January to June 1920 being principal organ of the city authorities. Then here the trade-union club, the House of workers of education, Avtomotoklub were placed. At the end of 1935 all building was transferred to the city Palace of pioneers and school students.

During German occupation in the Second World War, the house was occupied by the German police from April 1942. At liberation of Taganrog the building burned down. In August 1959 the building began to be restored, at the same time the facade and its planning were considerably changed, the second stores is built on, the entrance was issued by a portico from four square columns. The building changed the shape and it became difficult recognizable.

After reconstruction in the building apartments were placed.
